Mandy Ginsberg is an American businesswoman and manager, who is the former CEO of Match Group.

Early life and education 
Ginsberg graduated from the University of California, Berkeley and subsequently obtained an MBA from The Wharton School of the University of Pennsylvania.

Career 
In her early career Ginsberg served as Vice President of Consumer Technology for Edelman Public Relations Worldwide, and subsequently became Vice President of Worldwide Marketing at JDA Software.

IAC Group 
In 2006, Ginsberg joined IAC, where she has since served in different positions. In 2008 she became executive vice-president and general manager of Match Group’s North American operations and in 2010 was nominated as CEO of the Match Group Americas, where she continued to focused the Match U.S. brand, Match Affinity Brands, OkCupid, PlentyOfFish, ParPerfeito and the brands north and south American expansion. She also served as CEO of the IAC's Tutor.com, and when the company bought The Princeton Review in 2014, Ginsberg continued to serve as CEO of the newly formed company.

Since August 2017, Ginsberg served as CEO of Match Group. The group currently owns more than 45 brands (e.g. Tinder, Hinge, OkCupid) and is active in 190 countries and 42 languages. When Ginsberg took over operations she had the entire company audited, to secure equal pay between men and women. She also uses and promotes as system of paying raises, without employees demanding them. In January 2020, Ginsberg stepped down from her position as the CEO of Match Group due to personal reasons.

Personal life 
Ginsberg is married for the second time and has two daughters.

References 

Living people
University of California, Berkeley alumni
Wharton School of the University of Pennsylvania alumni
21st-century American businesspeople
IAC (company) people
Year of birth missing (living people)
Women chief executives
Directors of Uber